General William Wright Crouch (born July 12, 1941) is a retired United States Army four-star general who served as Vice Chief of Staff of the United States Army from 1997 to 1998.

Early life
Crouch was born on July 12, 1941 in Los Angeles, California. He attended the San Diego Army and Navy Academy and graduated from Claremont Men's College with a degree in Civil Government. He holds a master's degree in History from Texas Christian University.

Military career
Crouch commanded soldiers at every level from platoon through to army. He began his service in 1963 as a cavalry platoon leader in the 5th Infantry Division. He went on to command four companies, two of which were cavalry troops in combat. His subsequent commands included a cavalry squadron, the 2nd Armored Cavalry Regiment and the 5th Infantry Division. He also served as Commanding General of the Eighth United States Army and Chief of Staff United Nations Command/Combined Forces Command and United States Forces Korea.

Crouch assumed command of United States Army Europe on December 19, 1994, and assumed command of Allied Land Forces Central Europe (LANDCENT) on February 15, 1996, and was its first American since its establishment in 1993. He served as Vice Chief of staff from 1997 until his retirement in 1998.

Crouch is a graduate of the United States Army Command and General Staff College and the United States Army War College. His decorations include the Defense Distinguished Service Medal, the Army Distinguished Service Medal, the Silver Star, the Legion of Merit, and the Bronze Star Medal with oak leaf cluster.

Awards and decorations

Post-military career

He has also served on the board of directors of the Community Anti-Drug Coalitions of America, and since May 2005 has served on the board of Directors of FLIR Systems. He is also a Senior Mentor with the Leadership Development and Education Program for Sustained Peace at the United States Naval Postgraduate School, serves on the board of the Keck Institute for International and Strategic Studies at Claremont McKenna College, and sits on the advisory board of Isilon Systems.

Personal life
Crouch's wife, Vicki, also a native of Southern California, attended Scripps College, as did their two daughters Cami and Cathi. The Crouches have two grandchildren, Chris and Elizabeth, and reside in Colorado.

References

1941 births
Living people
People from Los Angeles
Claremont McKenna College alumni
Texas Christian University alumni
United States Army Command and General Staff College alumni
United States Army War College alumni
Recipients of the Silver Star
Recipients of the Legion of Merit
United States Army generals
United States Army Vice Chiefs of Staff
Recipients of the Defense Distinguished Service Medal
Military personnel from California